The Lexington Extension of the Louisville Southern Railroad, in Anderson and Woodford counties near Lawrenceburg, Kentucky, was listed on the National Register of Historic Places in 2004.

The listing included seven contributing structures. This portion is between Lawrenceburg and Versailles and includes the Young's High Bridge and the Cedar Brook Viaduct, as well as three wooden trestle bridges.

References

Kentucky railroads
National Register of Historic Places in Anderson County, Kentucky
National Register of Historic Places in Woodford County, Kentucky
Railway lines opened in 1889
1889 establishments in Kentucky
Transportation in Woodford County, Kentucky
Transportation in Anderson County, Kentucky
Railway buildings and structures on the National Register of Historic Places in Kentucky